Franz Pfender (August 5, 1899 – July 9, 1972) was a German politician of the Christian Democratic Union (CDU) and former member of the German Bundestag.

Life 
Pfender was a member of the state parliament for Württemberg-Hohenzollern from 1946 to 1952. At the same time, after the federal elections in 1949, he moved into the first German Bundestag via the state list of the CDU Württemberg-Hohenzollern, of which he was a member until 1953. In the Bundestag he was a member of the Committee for Reconstruction and Housing, the Committee for Homeland Displacement and the Committee for Internal Restructuring.

Literature

References

1899 births
1972 deaths
Members of the Bundestag for Baden-Württemberg
Members of the Bundestag 1949–1953
Members of the Bundestag for the Christian Democratic Union of Germany
Members of the Landtag of Württemberg